"Hur svårt kan det va?" is a song written by Johan Fransson, Tim Larsson and Tobias Lundgren, and originally performed by Linda Bengtzing in the fourth semifinal of Melodifestivalen 2008 in Karlskrona on 1 March of that year. The song headed directly to the final at the Stockholm Globe Arena, and subsequently achieved fifth place.

On 27 April 2008, the song entered Svensktoppen, where it ended up peaking at number nine. The following week, the song had been knocked out of the chart.

The single was released on 9 March 2008, and peaked at number 3 on the Swedish singles chart.

Single track listing
Hur svårt kan det va (original)
Hur svårt kan det va (instrumental)

Charts

References

External links 
Information at Svensk mediedatabas

2008 singles
Linda Bengtzing songs
Melodifestivalen songs of 2008
Swedish-language songs
2008 songs
Songs written by Johan Fransson (songwriter)
Songs written by Tim Larsson
Songs written by Tobias Lundgren